The Lely method, also known as the Lely process or Lely technique, is a crystal growth technology used for producing silicon carbide crystals for the semiconductor industry. The patent for this method was filed in the Netherlands in 1954 and in the United States in 1955 by Jan Anthony Lely of Philips Electronics. The patent was subsequently granted on 30 September 1958, then was refined by D. R. Hamilton et al. in 1960, and by V. P. Novikov and V. I. Ionov in 1968.

Overview
The Lely method produces bulk silicon carbide crystals through the process of sublimation. The silicon carbide near the outer walls of the crucible sublimes and is deposited on a graphite rod near the center of the crucible, which is at a lower temperature. 

Several modified versions of the Lely process exist, most commonly the silicon carbide is heated from the bottom end rather than the walls of the crucible, and deposited on the lid. Other modifications include varying the temperature, temperature gradient, argon pressure, and geometry of the system.

See also
Acheson process
Czochralski method
Sublimation sandwich method

References

Crystallography
Materials science
Thin film deposition